Jut may refer to:
 Jut, Iran, a village in Hormozgan Province, Iran
 Jut Line, a neighbourhood of Jamshed Town, Karachi, Pakistan
 jut, the ISO 639-3 code for the Jutlandic dialect of the Danish language
 Hendrik Jut (1851–1878), Dutch murderer
 Nikolaj Jut or Nikolai Yut (1898–1967), Russian Chuvash writer
 Jut or zud, massive dying of livestock due to impossibility of grazing in Asian steppe areas

See also
 Jute, a coarse vegetable textile fiber
 Jutes, a historical Germanic people